The U.S. Pro Tennis Championships were played each year from 1927 to 1999 (except 1944). Up to 1967, before the start of the "Open Era", this tournament was regarded as part of the professional grand slam. In 1963 the tournament failed financially but was revived in Boston without a break. 

After World War II Bobby Riggs, Pancho Segura and Pancho Gonzales won the Championships multiple times. Into the 1960s, the most frequent winners were Rod Laver and Ken Rosewall.

1946

1947

1948

1949

1950

1951

Cleveland

Forest Hills

1 withdrew due to injury.

1952

1953

1954
Note – Sources vary as to which event was the U.S. Pro in 1954. At the time, Los Angeles had the semi-official title.

Los Angeles

Cleveland

1955

1956

1957

1958

1959

1960

1961

1962

1963

1964

1965

1966

1967

See also
 U.S. Pro Tennis Championships draws, 1927–1945
 French Pro Championship draws
 Wembley Professional Championships draws

References

 
Chestnut Hill, Massachusetts
History of Middlesex County, Massachusetts
Sports in Middlesex County, Massachusetts
Tourist attractions in Middlesex County, Massachusetts
Tennis tournaments in Massachusetts
Tennis in Chicago
Tennis in Cleveland
Tennis in Los Angeles
Tennis tournaments in New York (state)
Tennis tournaments in the United States
Professional tennis tournaments before the Open Era